After That It's All Gravy is an EP by Gravy, released on August 27, 1996 by Fused Coil. the album was executive-produced by Jared Louche of Chemlab.

Reception 
Aiding & Abetting called the music as lacking and the album "compelling, but not necessarily for the right reasons." babysue also criticized the music for being impenetrably experimental, stating that "the overall effect is that you've left a television set on in the other room, and you can't really get a grip on what program is on."

Track listing

Personnel
Adapted from the liner notes of After That It's All Gravy.

Gravy
 Julie Cafritz – instruments
 Joey Defilipps – instruments
 Kim Rancourt – instruments, photography, design

Production and design
 Greg Calbi – mastering
 Don Fleming – producer
 Jared Hendrickson – executive-producer
 Mark Ohe – photography, design
 Tom Smith – mixing
 Jim Waters – engineering

Release history

References

External links 
 After That It's All Gravy at Discogs (list of releases)

1996 debut EPs
Fifth Colvmn Records EPs